James Edward Simmons Jr. (born 1979) is an American lawyer serving as a United States district judge of the United States District Court for the Southern District of California. He served as a judge of the San Diego County Superior Court from 2017 to 2023.

Early life and education 

Simmons was raised in Los Angeles. He received a Bachelor of Arts from the University of California, Berkeley in 2001 and a Juris Doctor from the Golden Gate University School of Law in 2004.

Career 

In 2005, Simmons was a deputy city attorney in the San Diego City Attorney's Office. From 2006 to 2017, he was a deputy district attorney in the San Diego County District Attorney's Office. During his tenure, he worked in the juvenile division, the superior court division and the gangs division. He has volunteered for Project LEAD.

State judicial service 

On November 2, 2017, Governor Jerry Brown appointed Simmons as a judge of the San Diego County Superior Court to fill the vacancy left by the retirement of Judge David M. Szumowski. He left the state bench in March 2023 when he was elevated to the federal bench.

Federal judicial service 

On July 14, 2022, President Joe Biden nominated Simmons to serve as a United States district judge of the United States District Court for the Southern District of California. Senators Alex Padilla and Dianne Feinstein support his nomination. President Biden nominated Simmons to the seat vacated by Judge Anthony J. Battaglia, who assumed senior status on March 31, 2021. On November 30, 2022, a hearing on his nomination was held before the Senate Judiciary Committee. On January 3, 2023, his nomination was returned to the President under Rule XXXI, Paragraph 6 of the United States Senate. He was renominated on January 23, 2023. On February 9, 2023, his nomination was reported out of committee by a 13–8 vote. On March 1, 2023, the Senate invoked cloture on his nomination by a 51–45 vote. On March 9, 2023, his nomination was confirmed by a 51–43 vote. He received his judicial commission on March 10, 2023.

See also
 List of African-American federal judges
 List of African-American jurists

References

External links 

1979 births
Living people
21st-century American judges
21st-century American lawyers
African-American judges
African-American lawyers
California lawyers
California state court judges
Golden Gate University School of Law alumni
Judges of the United States District Court for the Southern District of California
People from Inglewood, California
United States district court judges appointed by Joe Biden
University of California, Berkeley alumni